Two Japanese Naval vessels have been named Un'yō:

 , a gunboat active during the Boshin War

Imperial Japanese Navy ship names
Japanese Navy ship names